Suriname competed at the 1992 Summer Olympics in Barcelona, Spain. Six competitors, five men and one woman, took part in seven events in three sports.

Medalists

Competitors
The following is the list of number of competitors in the Games.

Athletics

Men

Women

Cycling

One male cyclist represented Suriname in 1992.

Road

Swimming

Men

References

External links
Official Olympic Reports
International Olympic Committee results database

Nations at the 1992 Summer Olympics
1992
Oly